Islington South may refer to:
 Islington South and Finsbury (UK Parliament constituency) (1974–present)
 Islington South (UK Parliament constituency) (1885–1950)
 Islington South (London County Council constituency) (1889–1949)

See also
 Islington South West (UK Parliament constituency) (1950–1974)
 Islington South West (London County Council constituency) (1949–1965)